Splashdot is a privately held company based in Vancouver. The company provides online loyalty programs and interactive promotions using gamification techniques, and powered by their software platform, nCentive. Founded in 2000 by Jonathan Csakany, President, and Patrick Watson, CEO, SplashDot progressed from offering user-generated content services to specializing in online customer loyalty and promotional programs.

By 2007, Splashdot was working with 75% of Canada's gaming jurisdictions including Ontario Lottery and Gaming Corporation, Atlantic Lottery Corporation, Great Canadian Gaming, and other non-gaming organizations such as WestJet, Kraft Foods and Bell Canada.

In 2012,  opened up its second office on Montreal, Quebec, Canada.

nCentive

nCentive is a software application that enables campaign design, development, management and analysis. Its features include member management (for both the end user and administrator), contest management (draws, cheat prevention and detection, code entry modules etc.), reporting, email marketing, polls and surveys, data management and engagement modules that allow for in-site personalization.

References

Online companies of Canada